At least two ships of the French Navy have been named Brestois:

 , a  launched in 1927 and sunk in 1942.
 , a  launched in 1952 and expended as a target in 1976 .

French Navy ship names